Erwin Laskowsky (27 May 1914 – 13 October 1983) was a German Luftwaffe ace and recipient of the Knight's Cross of the Iron Cross during World War II. The Knight's Cross of the Iron Cross was awarded to recognise extreme battlefield bravery or successful military leadership.  During his career Erwin Laskowsky  was credited with 46 aerial victories in 300+ missions.

Awards and decorations
 Aviator badge
 Front Flying Clasp of the Luftwaffe in Gold
 Iron Cross (1939)
 2nd Class (25 May 1942)
 1st Class (15 November 1942)
 Wound Badge (1939)
 in Black (19 June 1943)
 German Cross in Gold (1 January 1945)
 Knight's Cross of the Iron Cross on 27 April 1945 as Oberfeldwebel and pilot in the 8./Jagdgeschwader 11

References

Citations

Bibliography

External links
Auf Himmel Zu Hause.com
TracesOfWar.com

1914 births
1983 deaths
People from the Province of Westphalia
Luftwaffe pilots
German World War II flying aces
Recipients of the Gold German Cross
Recipients of the Knight's Cross of the Iron Cross
Military personnel from Bochum